"No No Never" was the  entry in the Eurovision Song Contest 2006, performed in English by Texas Lightning. Thus, it was performed eighth on the night, following 's Fabrizio Faniello with "I Do" and preceding 's Sidsel Ben Semmane with "Twist of Love". At the close of voting, it had received 36 points, placing 14th in a field of 24.

"No No Never" was also issued as a single in German-speaking Europe, serving as the second release from Texas Lightning's first album, Meanwhile, Back at the Ranch (2005), in 2006. In Germany, the song spent 39 weeks on the German Singles Chart, reaching number one for three nonconsecutive weeks in May and June 2006. It ended the year as Germany's second-best-selling hit and was certified platinum by the Bundesverband Musikindustrie (BVMI). In Austria and Switzerland, the song peaked within the top 10.

Composition
Written and composed by Australian-born band member Jane Comerford, the unusual choice of country as the genre resulted in BBC commentator Terry Wogan asking jokingly and with a rough approximation of the appropriate accent "are we in Athens, Georgia?" at the end of the performance (the contest was held in Athens, Greece). Lyrically, the song can be read as a pledge of the singer's undying love for her lover, but Comerford has stated that the chorus at least—"I'm never ever gonna leave you to cry on your own / Never ever gonna not go and pick up the phone / I'm never ever gonna let you be chilled to the bone"—was inspired by her desire to comfort her niece upon the untimely death of her father.

Eurovision
As one of the band's members is a professional comedian, there was a level of expectation that the Eurovision performance of the song was going to be humorous; however, this was not the case. While the band performed in front of artificial cactus plants, there was in fact very little overt humour in the performance. All members were dressed appropriately, with the musicians wearing beige suits and stetson hats and Comerford wearing a pink dress. The song was succeeded as the German representative at the Eurovision Song Contest 2007 by Roger Cicero with "Frauen regier'n die Welt".

Track listings
German maxi-CD single
 "No No Never" – 3:00
 "Waterloo" – 2:57
 "I Can't Get Your Horse Off My Mind" – 2:50
 "No No Never" (video) – 3:13
 Interview video – 5:17
 Live photo gallery

European CD single
 "No No Never" – 3:00
 "Waterloo" – 2:57

Credits and personnel
Credits are lifted from the German maxi-CD single liner notes.

Studios
 Recorded and mixed in January 2006 at Gaga Studio (Hamburg, Germany)
 Mastered at Soundgarden Studio (Hamburg, Germany)

Texas Lightning
 Jane Comerford – music, lyrics, lead vocals, ukulele
 Jon Flemming Olsen – guitars, art direction and design
 Markus Schmidt – electric guitars, banjo
 Uwe Frenzel – bass
 Olli Dittrich – drums
 Texas Lightning – co-production

Additional personnel
 Nils Tuxen – pedal steel guitar
 Stephan Gade – production, mixing
 Marc Schettler – mixing, engineering
 Chris von Rautenkranz – mastering

Charts

Weekly charts

Year-end charts

Decade-end charts

Certifications

References

External links
 Official Eurovision Song Contest site, history by year
 Detailed info & lyrics, Diggiloo Thrush

2006 singles
2006 songs
Eurovision songs of 2006
Eurovision songs of Germany
Number-one singles in Germany
X-Cell Records singles